Alexander Island is a 5.4 hectare island in the Collie River, Western Australia.

The island was part of a 120 hectare land grant made to George Leake in 1839. Because it was located in the middle of the river, it was left in a relatively undisturbed state. In 2005, it was recognised as an important wildlife habitat, and purchased by the Government of Western Australia for $110,000. It is now reserved as open space under the Greater Bunbury Region Scheme.

References

Bunbury, Western Australia
Nature reserves in Western Australia
Islands of the South West (Western Australia)